Gurchin Qaleh (also Romanized as Gūrchīn Qal‘eh and Govarchīn Qal‘eh; also known as Gauharchīn Qal‘eh, Goorchin Ghal‘eh, Gūvarchīn Qal‘eh, and Gyuarchinkala) is a village in Anzal-e Shomali Rural District, Anzal District, Urmia County, West Azerbaijan Province, Iran. At the 2006 census, its population was 598, in 194 families.

References 

Populated places in Urmia County